"Only You" is a song by Congolese-French rapper Gims featuring Kosovo-Albanian singer Dhurata Dora. It was released as the third single for the reissue of his fourth studio album, Les Vestiges du fléau (2021).

Charts

Release history

References 

2021 songs
2021 singles
French pop songs
Gims songs
Songs written by Gims